First Philippine Holdings Corporation (FPH) is a management and investment company whose major business is power generation and distribution, with strategic initiatives in manufacturing and property development. FPH is a member of the Lopez Group of Companies.

Its power generation subsidiary, First Gen Corporation (First Gen), is a renewable energy producer, with power plants that use geothermal, hydro, and natural gas for fuel. Today, it has a total installed capacity of 2,832.6 MW, or 18.2% of the country's total installed capacity. First Gen manages the world's second largest geothermal power producer, Energy Development Corporation, which searches for indigenous, low-carbon energy alternatives.

FPH's manufacturing subsidiary, First Philippine Electric Corporation (First Philec), operates the country's first large-scale silicon wafer-slicing facility called First Philec Solar Corporation (FPSC), which supplies some of the world's photovoltaic companies. FPSC is a joint venture of First Philec and SunPower Corporation, in the solar industry.

In property development, FPH expands its reach through Rockwell Land Corporation (Rockwell Land) and First Philippine Industrial Park (FPIP).

FPH maintains its corporate headquarters at Rockwell Business Center Tower 3 in Ortigas Center at Pasig, Philippines.

The founder
In the 1950s, then-President Carlos Garcia pushed for a larger Filipino role in the nation's economic activities. Among the many Filipino entrepreneurs whose businesses flourished in this period was Eugenio Lopez Sr., a businessman who would soon establish a conglomerate that would become First Philippine Holdings Corporation.

Lopez graduated from the Ateneo de Manila University in 1919, with an AB Degree, Cum Laude. He went on to study law in the University of the Philippines and after passing the bar exams, he underwent a year of post graduate studies in law at Harvard University.

Lopez had various businesses. In 1932, he established the Iloilo-Negros Air Express Company. He also made his mark in sugar milling, with the acquisition of the Binalbagan-Isabela Sugar Company (BISCOM). He was a power in media, owning The Manila Chronicle newspaper and ABS-CBN Corporation. He was also one of the founders of the Philippine Commercial and Industrial Bank (PCI Bank). In 1962, Lopez acquired Meralco.

History

The first decade (1961–1970)

Meralco was so large that many Filipino businessmen believed that its acquisition by a Filipino was nearly impossible. By 1960, Meralco was worth $66 million and served more than 360,000 customers. In 1961, Fortune Magazine cited that the company's operations and equipment were comparable to the best US power firms.

But although Meralco was a stable and highly profitable enterprise, the government's decree of pushing for more Filipino participation in the business prodded General Public Utilities (GPU) president Albert F. Tegen, to find a buyer for the company. Tegen approached a number of the leaders in the Manila's business community, including the Araneta-Zobel group, which balked at buying only 5% of the company.

Eventually the key people involved in the buyout of the company – Tegen and Roberto T. Villanueva, BISCOM's Chairman of the Board, crossed paths in New York. Villanueva was pursuing the owners of Victorias Milling Company, a Negros-based sugar company, to make an offer for their firm. However, the owners remained unwilling to sell.

Knowing that Villanueva was instrumental in the successful Filipino buyout of several companies, Tegen asked him to explore the possibility of the Lopez Group buying Meralco.

Even Lopez knew how risky the Meralco deal would be, for none of his previous business acquisitions amounted to its sale price. Buying Meralco and running it well required tremendous capital, managerial talent, and personal focus. But Don Eugenio was a visionary – he recognized the opportunities in the power industry.

Two syndicate of banks were established to handle this big transaction – one was a US Bank headed by Citibank and another local bank headed by PCI Bank. The Lopez Group paid a 10% down payment and the balance was paid over a 10-year period.

So on June 8, 1961, Tegen and Villanueva signed a preliminary agreement between GPU and the Lopez Group. Lopez needed a new corporate entity to take over the Meralco assets. Two days after, Meralco Securities Corporation (MSC) was established. It was principally organized to acquire ownership of the Manila Electric Company and manage its business. In the years that followed, MSC went beyond being an acquisition and management tool for Meralco – it also became an important company in its own right.

Initially, its capital stock was at Php 450M and the number of initial stakeholders was 605. Its 14 initial incorporators comprised some of the brightest businessmen at that time: Rafael Anton, Salvador Araneta, Antonio Delgado, Senen Gabaldon, Emilio Gonzales La'O, Ricardo Ledesma, Eugenio Lopez, Eugenio Lopez, Jr. (Geny), Alfredo Montelibano, Ernesto Oppen, Jr., Ernesto Rufino, Sr., Jose Soriano, Dolores De Tuazon, and Roberto Villanueva.

For the first few years, MSC had no independent life; its fate was tied to the success of Meralco. Because it was primarily focused on acquiring Meralco, it was virtually unknown. But after 1966, MSC's time to shine came.

Up to 1962, Meralco was greatly dependent on the National Power Corporation (NAPOCOR/NPC) for 35% of its power requirements. While NAPOCOR had a program for expansion, the program was delayed and it took them more than two years to put up a power plant. It built a new power plant every 18 months, and expanded its generating capacity fivefold, from 300,000 kW to 1.5 million kW in 10 years. At this time, Meralco's rates were among the lowest in the world.

The second decade (1971–1980)
MSC's management had two main goals in mind: to pay for the buy out of Meralco and run it far better than it had been before. Lopez recruited Filipino managers, such as Meralco Chief Finance Officer Vicente Paterno, Antonio Ozaeta and Christian Monsod, while retaining some of the American managers like Lee Garner, Russ Swartley and Steve Psinakis. Eventually, most of these managers headed various local and multinational corporations.

By 1966, its initial financial pressures were beginning to ease. Paterno's success in tapping new funds from international capital markets freed the company from major financial worries for at least the next four years. In late 1966, Meralco shareholders received dividends for the first time. In the same year, Don Eugenio created a Department of Economic Research and Development headed by his son, Oscar M. Lopez. Together with Ernesto "Ernest" Rufino, Jr., Oscar sought to make MSC as broad as possible. Their efforts focused on the following areas: expanding the Meralco franchise area, computer services, construction, banking, and financial services.

Oscar and Ernest saw the need to bring fuel from Batangas to Sucat in the cheapest possible way. As a result, MSC created the first commercial pipeline in the country. The pipeline transported bunker oil to Meralco power plants. Even oil companies such as Pilipinas Shell and Caltex needed to transport white oil products more efficiently from Batangas to other oil depots, as they were still using barges and trucks. Thus, two pipelines were created. One transported black oil products which included bunker fuel and crude oil, and the other ferried white oil products such as gasoline, diesel, and LPG. This new company, called Meralco Securities Industrial Corporation, was created on March 31, 1967. It was later renamed as First Philippine Industrial Corporation (FPIC).

Aside from the pipeline industry, MSC created Philippines Engineering Construction Corporation (PECCO) with Lorenzo R. Funtanilla project superintendent Pililla Rizal thereafter was the sister company became ECCO-Asia now Philec and many other subsidiaries.

But during the term of then-President Ferdinand Marcos in 1970, the Philippines was confronted with its worst economic crisis which stemmed from economic mismanagement, affected the government's ballooning debt, the peso devaluation, and other factors. The crisis lasted for 25 years and Meralco, the cornerstone of the MSC conglomerate, was the hardest hit. The annual increase in electricity demand was anemic while the company's net income dropped from Php 62.2M in 1969 to Php 10.3M in 1971.

It was not only the financial crisis that challenged Meralco. At that time, the Philippines was also plunging deeper into a political crisis. While Philippine society was modernizing and becoming more diverse, politics was becoming increasingly polarized between the conservative elite and emergent forces calling for political, social, and economic change.

Public discontent with the administration grew from alleged issues of corruption and human rights violation. Consecutive protests took place – showing the Filipinos' grievances over the social injustices they were witnessing. This was what later became known as the First Quarter Storm.

On September 21, 1972, President Ferdinand Marcos issued Proclamation No. 1081, placing the entire country under martial law. Along with this, he also issued Letter of Instruction 2 which instructed the military to take over all public utilities such as Philippine Long Distance Telephone Company and Meralco. And shortly after the midnight of September 22, elements of the 51st Army Engineering Brigade entered the Meralco compound and took over the power company.

The Marcos regime used various tactics to force Don Eugenio to hand over his controlling stake in MSC and Meralco to the dictator and his cronies. Two of which included a government-imposed cut in power rates and the imprisonment of Geny, his eldest son, on trumped-up charges.

Under duress and with fear of not seeing his son Geny set free, Don Eugenio was forced to sign an agreement on November 29, 1973, ceding ownership of MSC to Benjamin "Kokoy" Romualdez, brother of First Lady Imelda Marcos and an alleged Marcos bagman. Despite this, Marcos reneged on his promise to set Geny free even until Don Eugenio's death on July 6, 1975, in San Francisco, US.

In 1978, MSC was renamed First Philippine Holdings Corporation. First Holdings went on a huge expansion program, which included the acquisition of 25% of Pilipinas Shell. First Holdings also organized another wholly owned subsidiary, First Holdings International (FHI), to coordinate the overseas activities of Engineering and Construction Corporation of Asia and the Pacific Engineering Company, Inc. The establishment of FHI positioned the company for expanding its contracting and project management services abroad, particularly in the Middle East, which was then regarded as the primary source of profitable undertakings.

But the magnitude of its investments and the unfavorable conditions in the financial market, led to the near-collapse of First Holdings by the mid-1980s. The country was experiencing a prolonged recession in the second half of 1983. Massive capital flight of international investors immediately followed. Almost overnight, credit from both foreign and local sources dried up. Forcing bankruptcy, management of corporate debt became a major concern of the company. To eliminate its debt, First Holdings sold its equity in Pilipinas Shell Petroleum Corporation while First Holdings Center in Makati was sold to a group of banks.

Amidst divestment of assets and scaled down activities, the company suffered years of consolidated net losses. In 1985, this situation was further aggravated with the termination of its subcontract for the Hail electrification project in Saudi Arabia.

With the national economy in ruins and failure of the electoral process, calls for reform were coming from the local and foreign community. President Marcos was hounded by pressure from many sides – an increasingly restive people, a rapidly failing economy, growing doubts by foreign creditors, a hostile international press, and unbridled corruption of his closest allies.

With the economy in ruins and increasing pressure, both internal and external, Marcos called for "snap" elections. What was once an unruly and fractious opposition came together in time to put up one presidential candidate, Corazon "Cory" Aquino. The election took place with international media representatives and invited observers of foreign governments covering the event. Many Filipinos volunteered as poll watchers – guarding the ballot boxes with their life. Such courage, however, did not prevent the widespread fraud and terrorism which caused the failure of the electoral process.

Subsequently, members of the military, led by the Minister of National Defense and the Vice Chief of Staff of the Armed Forces broke with President Marcos and announced their support for Corazon Aquino, whom they regarded as the duly elected president of the Philippines; even when the late Pres. Ferdinand Marcos wins the election. Filipinos from all walks of life gathered together joins to fight Philippine's Government – to the historic EDSA revolution. Democracy was reborn. For First Holdings, these turn of events eventually made it possible to be privately owned instead of being owned by the government and its people.

The third decade (1981–1990)
After the EDSA Revolution, the Lopezes regained control of First Holdings. Oscar Lopez took the helm of a battered company, which was nearly bankrupt with over Php 1.2 billion in debt.

But it was not only the parent company which needed rehabilitation. Even its subsidiaries had to get moving. There were two principle tasks which had to be done: generating more cash flow and a respectable rate of return for the stockholders. Both of these turned out to be considerable challenges, but the people in First Holdings took them one step at a time – and they prevailed.

After one year, the company was able to reschedule and rearrange most of its debt load by selling some assets. It also began the long process of reacquiring part of its stake in Meralco. And in 1990, the company made its first profit since 1983 of Php 28 million.

The fourth decade (1991–2000)
In 1992, First Holdings re-entered the power generation business through the building of a 225 MW diesel plant under Bauang Private Power Corporation (Bauang Power). At that time, Bauang Power held several distinctions: it was the only predominantly Filipino-owned fast track power plant in the country to offer the cheapest power among many fast track plants, the largest medium-diesel plant in the world, and the fastest commissioning for a plant of its type in the world.

It diversified into more businesses and opened new plants. The company took part in developing the Malampaya Project, the largest and most significant industrial investment in the history of the Philippines which signals the birth of the country's natural gas industry. In partnership with British Gas plc, First Holdings created First Gas Corporation Holdings to build and run the first gas-fired combined-cycle gas turbine power plants in the country. Under First Gas are the 1,000 MW Sta. Rita and 500 MW San Lorenzo power plants, both located in Batangas.

This decade also marked the company's entry into infrastructure with the development of the North Luzon Expressway (NLEX), an 84-kilometer highway – the longest toll road in the country in terms of lane-kilometers.

In 1994, the First Philippine Infrastructure Development Corporation (FPIDC) was formed to enter into partnership with the Philippine National Construction Corporation for the NLEX project. FPIDC incorporated the Manila North Tollways Corporation (MNTC) in February 1997 as the operating company for the NLEX project.

The beginnings of the fifth decade (2001–present)
The NLEX project was the first project financed toll road undertaking in the country and also the first project to achieve financial close outside the power sector despite the global economic crisis.

The company also won the bid for the Subic–Clark–Tarlac Expressway (SCTEX) in 2007. SCTEX links three prime economic zones in Central Luzon: Subic Bay Freeport and Special Economic Zone, Clark Special Economic Zone, and Central Techno Park.

However, in 2008, First Holdings sold its toll road business to Metro Pacific Investment Corporation, a company with interests in real estate, utilities, and shipping.

In November 2006, First Gen won the bid to acquire the 112 MW Pantabangan-Masiway hydroelectric power plant complex from the Power Sector Assets & Liabilities Management. The following year, First Gen acquired a 60% economic interest in Philippine National Oil Company – Energy Development Corporation (EDC). EDC was established in 1976, to wean the country from its dependence on imported fuels by developing renewable sources of energy. It is active in wet steam field technology and is primarily engaged in the exploration, development, and optimization of geothermal fields.

Also, in 2008, the first large-scale silicon wafer-slicing plant was inaugurated in the Philippines – First Philec Solar Corp. This subsidiary, a joint venture between First Holdings and the Sunpower of the United States, aims to develop the solar energy industry in the Philippines and to compete with companies providing wafer-slicing services in China, Japan, and Germany.

The Philippines was not spared from the global financial crunch of 2008, and so was First Holdings. While the company enjoyed a favorable business climate in the past years, it was affected with the economic crisis. Currency movements, high finance costs, and other factors caused First Holdings to sell 20 percent of its ownership in Meralco to Philippine Long Distance Telephone Company (PLDT).

Management and employees
Each of First Holdings' subsidiaries has its own Human Resources departments and systems, but the parent company handles the talent management of the executives who are deployed in various subsidiaries as seconded employees.

The HR departments of the First Holdings Group are part of the Lopez Group HR Council, where they discuss and exchange their best practices in the group.

Corporate governance
First Holdings was among eight companies that received a gold award (a rating between 95 and 99%) for garnering the highest ratings, among 169 publicly listed companies, in the 2008 Corporate Governance Scorecard Project (CG-Sc), conducted by the Institute of Corporate Directors (ICD), Philippine Stock Exchange and Securities and Exchange Commission.

Corporate initiatives
First Holdings has adopted a manual on Corporate Governance, Corporate Code of Conduct, and Manual on Anti-Money Laundering.

The company's corporate governance has been entrusted to the board of directors. To ensure that independent, objective, and reasoned views are part of its board deliberations, First Holdings has more than what the law mandates of having at least 2 independent directors or at least 20 percent of a company's board membership. To date, the company has five existing independent directors.

In 2009, First Holdings marked two milestones in the company's corporate history.

First, it achieved triple certification when it successfully passed the audits for the ISO 9001, 14001, and OHSAS 18001 standards. It is the only holding company in the Philippines to receive an IMS certification from Certification International.

Second, it received a gold award from the ICD for its commitment to good corporate governance. First Holdings was among only eight companies who received a gold award (a rating between 95 and 99%) for garnering the highest ratings, among 169 publicly listed companies, in the 2008 CG-Sc, jointly conducted by the ICD, Philippine Stock Exchange and Securities and Exchange Commission.

The corporate initiatives also include standards based systems, management tools, and recognition awards. Part of its management tools include the environment, safety, and health programs (ESH) and the Six Sigma program. The prominent standards systems in use are ISO 9001, ISO 14001 and OHSAS 18001.

Meanwhile, ESH started in 1998 as a corporate initiative for companies in the First Holdings Group which was eventually rolled out for the whole Lopez Group.

Major investments
First Holdings has core investments in power generation and distribution, as well as infrastructure, with strategic investments in manufacturing and property.

Power generation
First Holdings, through First Gen Corporation, has investments in gas-fired, bunker-fired, hydroelectric and geothermal power generation plants.

Subsidiaries
 First Gen Corporation, is the largest vertically integrated power generation company in the Philippines today. It has an installed capacity of 2,582 MW, representing 17% of the country's total installed capacity. First Holdings has a 67% stake in First Gen.
 First Gas Holdings Corporation manages all the gas power projects of First Gen. Currently, it has two power projects: the 1000 MW Santa Rita and the 500 MW San Lorenzo Combined Cycle Gas Turbine Power (CCGT) projects, both of which are located at Sta. Rita, Batangas City. These two projects form part of the Malampaya Gas-to-Power Project, a program that calls for the supply of natural gas to combined cycle power plants with an aggregate capacity of 3,000 MW.
 Energy Development Corporation (EDC) is the largest geothermal producer in the Philippines and the second largest in the world. Today, it accounts for more than 60% of the installed geothermal capacity in the Philippines. Its steam fields are located in the provinces of Leyte, Negros Oriental, Bicol, and North Cotabato. EDC recently bought 60% of FGHPC.
 First Gen Hydro Power Corporation is the operating entity of the 112 MW Pantabangan – Masiway Hyrdro-Electric Power Plants. Through FGPHC, First Gen participated in the Wholesale Electricity Spot Market, where it became the largest non-government electricity trader.
 First Private Power Corporation (FPPC) owns 93.25% of the Bauang Private Power Corp. which operates the 225 MW bunker-fired diesel-engine Bauang Power Plant in La Union. Other FPPC shareholders are Meralco and JG Summit, Inc.
 First Gen Renewables (FGRI) (formerly First Philippine Energy Corp.) is the wholly owned renewables energy subsidiary of First Gen. FGRI owns FG Bukidnon Power Corp, which operates the 1.6 MW Agusan mini-hydro power plant in Damilag, Manolo Fortich, Bukidnon. FGRI uses energy technologies such as solar, wind, and mini-hydro.

Power distribution
First Holdings has core investments in power distribution through Manila Electric Company and Panay Electric Company.

Subsidiaries
 The Manila Electric Company (Meralco) is the country's largest electricity distributor and is one of the top 5 corporations in the Philippines. It marked its 105th year of service in 2008.
 Panay Electric Company (PECO) – Established in 1923, PECO is one of the oldest private electricity distribution utilities in the Philippines. Today, it remains to be the only private electric distributor in the whole island of Panay.

Infrastructure
First Holdings has investments in infrastructure. First Philippine Industrial Corporation is First Holdings' subsidiary engaged in pipeline services. Another subsidiary, First Balfour, Inc., is a construction company.

Subsidiaries
 FPIC owns and operates the largest and only commercial oil pipeline in the country, transporting crude and refined petroleum products from Batangas to Metro Manila. It was established in 1967 to service the fuel requirements of Meralco and the oil refineries in Batangas.
 First Balfour focuses on civil, mechanical and electrical works for road and bridge construction, residential and industrial buildings and plants, water supply and treatment plants, power plants, power transmission, and power distribution.

Manufacturing
First Holdings has strategic investments in manufacturing under First Philec Corporation.

Under First Philec, the Electricals Division support electric utilities and comprises Philippine Electric Corporation, First Electro Dynamics Corporation, and First Philippine Power Systems, Inc. The Electronics Division, through First Sumiden Circuits, First Philec Solar Corporation, and First Sumiden Realty, continues to provide much-needed employment and foreign exchange.

Subsidiaries
 First Philippine Electric Corporation is for electrical and electronics manufacturing and services.
 Philec is the country's pioneer manufacturer of distribution and power transformers. Established in 1969, it began its commercial operations under a technical and licensing agreement with Hitachi Ltd. of Japan, manufacturing distribution transformers.
 First Electro Dynamics Corporation (FEDCOR) is the country's largest service center for distribution and power transformers, and other distribution line equipment. It also provides maintenance services for substations and other electrical installations. FEDCOR also has the capability to manufacture distribution transformers and current transformers in conformance to international standards.
 First Philippine Power Systems (FPPS) started commercial operations in July 2006. It was established to primarily serve the dry-type transformer requirements of American Power Conversion, the world's leading manufacturer of large, uninterruptible power supply units. FPPS manufactures low-voltage, dry-type transformers for the industrial and original equipment manufacturer market.
 First Philec Manufacturing Technologies Corporation started commercial operations in July 2006.
 First Sumiden Circuits, Inc. (FSCI) is a joint venture amongmanufacturers Sumitomo Electric Industries, Inc. (51%), First Holdings (40%) and Sumitomo Corporation (9%). FSCI is a manufacturer of flexible printed circuits: thin and light weight wiring components with electronic circuits printed on flexible film. These are applied on hard disk drives, optical disk drives, mobile phones, pagers, cameras, car stereos and other items.
 First Philec Solar Corporation is the newest joint venture between First Philec and SunPower Philippines Manufacturing Ltd. This project is the first large-scale silicon wafer-slicing company in the Philippines.

Property
First Holdings has strategic investments in property through Rockwell Land Corporation and First Philippine Industrial Park. The project is a joint venture with Sumitomo Corporation.

Subsidiary
Rockwell Land Corporation is a real estate development company initially tasked to develop Rockwell Center, a  prime residential and commercial property located in Makati near the Central Business District.The Rockwell Center used to be the site of the Meralco-owned 130 MW Rockwell Thermal plant named after James Chapman Rockwell, Meralco's 2nd and 4th president.

Other subsidiary
FPIP is a 315-hectare, modern industrial estate. It caters to wide range of industries such as light and medium manufacturing for export as well as the domestic market, high technology and non-pollutive industries and IT.

Other subsidiaries
 Asian Eye Institute (AEI) is an eye care center. Established in 2001, AIE has served over 50, 000 patients, and is at the forefront of efforts to make available in Asia breakthrough technologies for eye care and treatment.AEI has two satellite clinics located in Ayala's Trinoma Mall and SM Mall of Asia.
 Securities Transfers Services, Inc. (STSI) – a securities and stock transfer company.

References

Further reading

 Añonuevo, E. P. (2008) First Philec set to serve solar energy industry, inaugurates wafer-slicing plant Retrieved January 5, 2008
 Colayaco, M.T. (1991). The cornerstone: The story of the First Philippine Holdings Corporation. Pasig: First Philippine Holdings Corporation.
 Energy Development Corporation (2009). PNOC Board of Directors Retrieved January 26, 2008
 First Philippine Holdings Corporation. (2007). Annual report Retrieved November 24, 2008
 First Philippine Holdings Corporation. (2006). Forty-five/fortified: 2006 Annual Report.
 First Philippine Holdings Corporation. (2005). Delivering on commitments: 2005 Annual Report.
 First Philippine Holdings Corporation. (2004). Philippines First: 2004 Annual Report.
 First Philippine Holdings Corporation. (2003). Eye on excellence: 2003 Annual Report.
 First Philippine Holdings Corporation. (2002). We continue to create: 2002 Annual Report.
 First Philippine Holdings Corporation. (2001). Annual report.
 First Philippine Holdings Corporation. (2000). Annual report.
 Koppisch, J. (2008). Special report: 48 heroes of philanthropy Retrieved December 15, 2008
 Lopez Group. Lopez Link, a monthly publication of the Lopez Group
 Rodrigo, R. (2001). Firebringer: Forty years of First Philippine Holdings 1961–2001. Pasig: Eugenio Lopez Foundation, Inc.
 Tanglaw. (2008)
 Tollways Management Corporation. (2008). Operation and maintenance of SCTEX awarded to joint venture group Retrieved January 4, 2008
 Oscar M. Lopez on turning 80 years old
 Oscar M. Lopez timeline: Living life well
 International Association of Business Communicators (IABC) Philippines  2010  Lifetime Achievement Award in Communication Excellence in Organizations
 Oscar M. Lopez  Remarks  at the Conferment of the Lifetime Achievement Award in the 2010 Communication Excellence (CEO Excel)
 Oscar M. Lopez 2009 The Outstanding Filipinos (TOFIL) Awardee for Business

Electric power companies of the Philippines
Companies listed on the Philippine Stock Exchange
Energy companies established in 1961
Companies based in Pasig
Lopez Group of Companies
1961 establishments in the Philippines